The 2010 Women's National Invitation Tournament (WNIT) is a single-elimination tournament of 64 National Collegiate Athletic Association (NCAA) Division I teams that did not participate in the 2010 NCAA Division I women's basketball tournament. The tournament is played entirely on campus sites. The highest ranked team in each conference that did not receive a bid to the NCAA Tournament received an automatic bid to this tournament. The remaining slots were filled by the WNIT Selection Committee.

2010 Preseason WNIT
At the beginning of the season, there is a Preseason WNIT.

Round 1
The games for round one were played on November 13.

Bracket 1
New Mexico 81, Northern Colorado 59
Florida Gulf Coast 66, UTEP 54
Georgia Tech 63, Winthrop 30
Oklahoma State 67, Arkansas Little-Rock 58

Bracket 2
Ohio State 91, Eastern Illinois 68
Bowling Green 76, Chicago State 41
Marist 80, North Carolina A&T 64
West Virginia 79, Towson 42

Round 2
The games for round one were played on November 15 and 16.

Bracket 1
New Mexico 80, Florida Gulf Coast 64
Oklahoma State 70, Georgia Tech 64

Bracket 2
Ohio State 91, Bowling Green 72
West Virginia 55 Marist 50

Semifinals and finals

Note: Asterisk denotes home team

Consolation rounds

Rounds 1&2
Friday, Nov. 20
North Carolina A&T 62, Chicago State 57 
UTEP 84, Eastern Illinois 80
Towson 56, Winthrop 46
Arkansas-Little Rock 55, Northern Colorado 43
Saturday, Nov. 21
Chicago State 45, Winthrop 41
Eastern Illinois 74, Northern Colorado 70 
Towson 74, NCA&T 69
UALR 64, UTEP 40

Round 3
Saturday, November 21 
Marist 70, Bowling Green 65
Georgia Tech 58, Florida Gulf Coast 48

2010 Postseason WNIT
The 2010 Women's National Invitation Tournament (WNIT) was a single-elimination tournament of 64 National Collegiate Athletic Association (NCAA) Division I teams that did not participate in the 2010 NCAA Division I women's basketball tournament. The 42nd annual tournament was played from March 17, 2010 to April 3, 2010, entirely on campus sites. The highest ranked team in each conference that did not receive a bid to the NCAA Tournament received an automatic bid to this tournament. The remaining slots were filled by the WNIT Selection Committee.

Participants

Automatic bids

At-Large bids

Brackets
Results to date (* indicates game went to overtime):

Region 1

Region 2

Region 3

Region 4

Semifinals and championship game

All-tournament team
 Alexis Gray-Lawson, California (MVP)
 DeNesha Stallworth, California
 Shenise Johnson, Miami (FL)
 Riquna Williams, Miami (FL)
 Nicolle Lewis, Illinois State
 Veronica Hicks, Michigan
Source:

See also
 2010 NCAA Division I men's basketball tournament
 2010 NCAA Division I women's basketball tournament
 2010 National Invitation Tournament
 2010 Women's Basketball Invitational

References

Women's National Invitation Tournament
Women's National Invitation Tournament
Women's National Invitation Tournament
Women's National Invitation Tournament
Women's National Invitation Tournament